{{Speciesbox
| image = 
| genus = Moringua
| species = ferruginea
| authority = Bliss, 1883 
| synonyms_ref = <ref>[http://www.fishbase.org/Nomenclature/SynonymsList.php?ID=12883&SynCode=28665&GenusName=Moringua&SpeciesName=ferruginea Synonyms of Moringua ferruginea] at www.fishbase.org.</ref>
| synonyms = * Aphthalmichthys intermedius Ogilby, 1907
}}

The rusty spaghetti eel, also known as the rusty worm eel, the slender worm eel, or the intermediate thrush-eel (Moringua ferruginea'') is an eel in the family Moringuidae (spaghetti/worm eels). It was described by Richard Bliss Jr. in 1883. It is a tropical, marine eel which is known from the Indo-Pacific region, including East Africa, Easter Island, the Ryukyu Islands, Australia, and Micronesia. It leads a benthic lifestyle, burrowing into sandy regions in reefs at a depth range of 1–40 m. Males can reach a maximum total length of 140 cm.

References

Moringuidae
Fish described in 1883